Trombidium susteri is a species of mite in the genus Trombidium in the family Trombidiidae. It is found in Germany and Romania.

Name
This species is named in honor of Dipterologist Petre Şuster (1896–1954).

References
 Synopsis of the described Arachnida of the World: Trombidiidae

Further reading
  (1956): Nouveaux acariens parasites des insectes nuisable appartenant au genre Phyllotreta.

Trombidiidae
Arachnids of Europe
Animals described in 1956